Andi Almqvist (born 2 July 1968) is a Swedish singer, musician and composer known for his dark, cinematic sound and haunting lyrics about life, death, alienation and dysfunctional love.

Almqvist has released five solo albums, Can't Stop Laughing (2005), Red Room Stories (2007), Glimmer (2009), Warsaw Holiday (2013) and Tiltad (2018).

Touring
Andi Almqvist has toured extensively over the years, headlining or supporting artists like Woven Hand, Mark Lanegan, Holly Golightly, Kaizer's Orchestra, B.B. King, The Blind Boys of Alabama and Bettye LaVette among others.

Almqvist has played many of Europe's big festivals, such as Eurosonic Festival (Holland), Les Ardentes (Belgium), Spot Festival (Denmark), Dias Nordicos (Spain), Peace & Love (Sweden), and Hultsfred Festival (Sweden).

He has also performed in venues around the world, such as Joe's Pub in New York City, Club Passim in Boston, 3rd and Lindsley in Nashville, Borderline in London, King Tut's in
Glasgow, Andrews Lane Theatre in Dublin, Le Mura in Rome, Kulturbrauerei in Berlin,
B72 in Vienna, Galileo Galilei in Madrid, Vega in Copenhagen,
Grand Theatre in Groningen, Debaser Medis in Stockholm and many
others.

Miscellaneous
During July and August 2010, Almqvist's song Low-Dive Jenny was the most downloaded on well-known American music magazine Paste Magazine's website.

In May 2011 the documentary "The Misadventures of Andi Almqvist" aired on Swedish national television. The film was released on DVD in November 2011.

In February 2012, Almqvist's song Big Bad Black Dog Blues was featured in American TV-series Justified, episode 5, season 3.

In May 2012 Andi Almqvist signed with Zentropa Music, the music division of film company Zentropa. Almqvist-song I Was Not To You What You Were to Me was featured in Thomas Vinterbergs film The Hunt, which was nominated for the Golden Palm in Cannes 2012. Mads Mikkelsen won the Best Actor Award for his performance in the movie. The Hunt was also nominated for an Academy Award  for Best Foreign Language Film.

In February 2015 Almqvist made his debut as actor/soloist in the Swedish musical Sånger Från En Inställd Skilsmässa, a collaboration between Malmö Opera and Skånes Dansteater.

In the spring of 2017, Swedish musical Sånger Från En Inställd Skilsmässa, toured entire Sweden. The national tour was produced by Riksteatern.

In November 2017 Almqvist released the single Kirseberg, his first song in the Swedish language.

In April 2018 Almqvist released the album Tiltad, also in Swedish.

Discography 

Studio albums
 2018 - Tiltad
 2013 - Warsaw Holiday
 2009 - Glimmer 
 2007 - Red Room Stories 
 2005 - Can't Stop Laughing

Singles
 2017 - Kirseberg

Live albums
 2011 - The Misadventures of Andi Almqvist

with KURZ 
 2016 - Vol 1.

Filmography 
 2011 - The Misadventures of Andi Almqvist – Concert and documentary DVD'

 Bibliography 
 2013 - Söta Serier - Comic book. Swedish language.

 Placements Film/TV 
 2019 - The Cultural Masturbator. Swedish documentary by Lena Mattsson. Contributes with the songs In The Land Of Slumber and Boneyard Blues.
 2017 - Angie Tribeca. American TV-series. Season 3. Trailer. Contributes with the song You ain't seen nothing yet (cover).
 2017 - Early Release. Canadian movie directed by John L'Ecuyer. Contributes with the song Weekend Trip to Hell.
 2014 - The Absent One. Danish movie directed by Mikkel Nørgaard. Contributes with the song  I Was Not To You What You Were To Me.
 2014 - Filip & Fredrik - Ska vi göra slut?. Swedish TV-series.  Contributes with the song  I Was Not To You What You Were To Me.  
 2013 - My Sweet Pepper Land. French/German movie directed by Huner Saleem. Contributes with the song Take Heed, Beware, Let Go.
 2013 - Niklas Mat. Swedish TV-series.  Contributes with the songs Boneyard Blues and Big Bad Black Dog Blues. 
 2013 - The Keeper Of Lost Causes. Danish movie directed by Mikkel Nørgaard. Contributes with the song I Was Not To You What You Were To Me.
 2012 - The Hunt. Danish movie directed by Thomas Vinterberg. Contributes with the song I Was Not To You What You Were To Me. The movie was nominated for an Academy Award for best foreign language film. The movie was also nominated for the Golden Palm in Cannes. 
 2012 - Justified, #5 season 3. American TV-series. Contributes with the song Big Bad Black Dog Blues.
 2012 - Sejit z cesty. Czech movie directed by Pavel Jandourek. Contributes with the songs Hyena and Big Bad Black Dog Blues. 
 2007 - Älgalus och vilda svin. Swedish documentary directed by Johan Palmgren. Contributes with the songs Can't Stop Laughing and The Devil Is A Girl.

 Theater 
 2017 - Sånger Från En Inställd Skilsmässa. Swedish national tour, produced på Riksteatern. Soloist/lead role. 
 2015 - Sånger Från En Inställd Skilsmässa, a co-production by Malmö Opera and Skånes Dansteater''. South Sweden tour. Soloist/lead role.

Music videos
Wormwood
Low-Dive Jenny
Pornography
Midnight
Death
Red Room

References

External links
 Facebook

Swedish male singers
Swedish composers
Swedish male composers
Living people
1968 births